Aphelandra rigida is a plant species in the family Acanthaceae, which is native to Atlantic Forest vegetation of Brazil.

External links
     UNEP-WCMC Species Database: Aphelandra rigida

rigida
Endemic flora of Brazil
Flora of the Atlantic Forest
Plants described in 1930